The 2020–21 Legia Warsaw season was the club's 104th season of existence, and their 84rd in the top flight of Polish football.

Players

Pre-season squad

Season squad

Transfers

In

Out

Friendlies
In January 2021, Legia Warsaw faced Liwa FC (8–0 victory), Dynamo Kyiv (2–0 victory), FC Krasnodar (0–0 draw), Stomil Olsztyn (3–1 victory) and Legia Warsaw II (3–0 victory).

Competitions

Ekstraklasa

League table

Results summary

Results by round

Matches

Polish Super Cup

Polish Cup

Champions League

Qualifying phase

Europa League

Qualifying phase

Statistics

Goalscorers

Notes

References

External links

Legia Warsaw seasons
Legia Warsaw
Legia Warsaw
Legia Warsaw